Priestley may refer to:

Places
 Priestley, West Virginia, US, an unincorporated community
 Priestley Glacier, a major valley glacier in Antarctica
 Priestley (lunar crater), on the far side of the Moon
 Priestley (Martian crater)
 5577 Priestley, an inner main belt asteroid

People

Arts 
 Alice Priestley (born 1962), Canadian children's writer and illustrator
 Brian Priestley (born 1940), English jazz writer, pianist and arranger
 Chris Priestley (born 1958), British children's book author and illustrator
 Jason Priestley (born 1969), Canadian-American actor
 J. B. Priestley (1894–1984), English writer and broadcaster
 Mark Priestley (1976–2008), Australian actor
Rick Priestley (born 1959), British miniature wargame designer and author
 Robert Priestley (1901–1986), American set decorator
 Tom Priestley (born 1932), sound and film editor

Sciences 
 Henry Priestley (biochemist) (1884–1961), Australian biochemist
 Hilary Priestley, British mathematician
 James Taggart Priestley (1903–1979), American surgeon
 John Gillies Priestley (1879–1941), British physiologist
 Joseph Hubert Priestley (1883–1944), British botanist
 Joseph Priestley (1733–1804), British theologian, dissenting clergyman, natural philosopher, chemist, educator, and political theorist
 Maurice Priestley (1933–2013), emeritus professor of statistics at the University of Manchester
 Raymond Priestley (1886–1974), British geologist and Antarctic explorer

Sports 
 Adam Priestley (born 1990), Gibraltarian footballer
 Akeem Priestley (born 1985), Jamaican footballer
 Dennis Priestley (born 1950), English darts player
 Donald Priestley (1887–1917), English cricketer 
 Gerry Priestley (born 1931), English footballer
 John Priestley (footballer) (1900–1980), Scottish footballer
 Neil Priestley (born 1961), English cricketer
 Robert Priestley (1911–2007), English cricketer
 Tommy Priestley (1911–1985), Northern Irish footballer

Other 
 Arthur Priestley (1865–1933), English Liberal Party politician and cricketer
 Briggs Priestley (1831–1907), English cloth manufacturer and Liberal Party politician
 Julian Priestley (1950–2017), Secretary-General of the European Parliament 1997–2007
 Mary Priestley (born 1925), British music therapist
 Philip Priestley (born 1946), British diplomat

Other uses
 Priestley College, a sixth-form college
 The Priestley, a proscenium theatre
 Dr. Priestley, a fictional investigator

See also 
Priestly, a surname